Joseph Roger de Benoist (2 August 1923 – 15 February 2017) was a French missionary, journalist, and historian. His main areas of study were French West Africa and the history of the Catholic Church in sub-Saharan Africa, particularly in Senegal, where he lived for several decades.

Biography
Father Joseph Roger de Benoist was part of the congregation of the White Fathers. He was born in Meudon and graduated from Lille Graduate School of Journalism with a doctorate in history.

Joseph Roger de Benoist was made Knight (1988) and then Officer (1997) of the French Legion of Honour. He was also an Officer in the Ordre national du Lion du Sénégal (1993). he died, aged 93, in Bry-sur-Marne, France.

Works
La balkanisation de l'Afrique occidentale francaise, (foreword by Léopold Sédar Senghor), 1979
L'Église catholique et la naissance des nouvelles nations en Afrique occidentale francophone, 1981
L'Afrique occidentale française de la Conférence de Brazzaville (1944) à l'indépendance (1960) (foreword by Amadou-Mahtar M'Bow), 1982
Les missionnaires catholiques du Soudan français et de la Haute-Volta entrepreneurs et formateurs d'artisans, 1983
Colonisation et évangélisation, 1985
Église et pouvoir colonial au Soudan français : les relations entre les administrateurs et les missionaires catholiques dans la Boucle du Niger, de 1885 à 1945 (foreword by Catherine Coquery-Vidrovitch), 1987
L'hebdomadaire catholique dakarois "Afrique Nouvelle" et la décolonisation de l'AOF, 1986
Félix Éboué et les missions catholiques, 1987
L'Église catholique en Afrique : deux millénaires d'histoire, 1991
Gorée, Guide de l'île et du Musée historique, 1993 (in collaboration with Abdoulaye Camara)
Le Mali, 1998
Histoire de Gorée, 2003 (in collaboration with Abdoulaye Camara, Françoise Descamps, Xavier Ricou and James Searing)
Léopold Sédar Senghor (with a testimony by Cheikh Hamidou Kane), 1998
Histoire de l'Église catholique au Sénégal : du milieu du XVe siècle à l'aube du troisième millénaire, 2008

See also
 Gorée
 History of Senegal

References

External links
 Interview
 La balkanisation de l'Afrique Occidentale Française - webAfriqa
 L’Afrique occidentale française de la Conférence de Brazzaville (1944) à l'indépendance (1960) - webAfriqa
 Presentation of his latest book and short biography

1923 births
2017 deaths
French Roman Catholic missionaries
White Fathers priests
French journalists
Historians of Africa
French male non-fiction writers
Roman Catholic missionaries in Senegal
French expatriates in Senegal